Phytoecia kurdistana is a species of beetle in the family Cerambycidae. It was described by Ganglbauer in 1883. It is known from Turkey, Armenia and Iran.

Varietas
 Phytoecia kurdistana var. korbi Pic, 1918
 Phytoecia kurdistana var. caucasica Pic, 1897
 Phytoecia kurdistana var. luristanica Pic, 1917

References

Phytoecia
Beetles described in 1883